The Borderel-Cail was a French automobile manufactured in Denain in the first decade of the twentieth century by Société J. F. Cail & Cie., who were a builder of railway locomotives since the 1840s.

In 1905 they built a 6-wheeled limousine, powered by a 4-cylinder engine. Power was supplied to the center axle, while both the front and rear wheels steered. An updated version of the car with a more powerful engine was shown at the 1906 Paris Salon. The final Borderel-Cail was a conventional 4-wheeled car with a 30-horsepower 4 cylinder engine, launched in 1907.

References

External links
Photo of 1905 6-wheeled limousine

Vintage vehicles
Defunct motor vehicle manufacturers of France